Henry J. "Handsome Harry" Boyle (September 20, 1860 – May 25, 1932) was a professional baseball player.  He was a pitcher over parts of 6 seasons (1884–1889) with the St. Louis Maroons and Indianapolis Hoosiers.  He led the National League in ERA in 1886 while playing for the Maroons. For his career, he compiled an 89–111 record in 207 appearances, with a 3.06 ERA and 602 strikeouts.

See also
 List of Major League Baseball annual ERA leaders

External links

1860 births
1932 deaths
Major League Baseball pitchers
Baseball players from Philadelphia
St. Louis Maroons players
Indianapolis Hoosiers (NL) players
National League ERA champions
Reading Actives players
Terre Haute Hottentots players
Indianapolis Hoosiers (minor league) players
19th-century baseball players